"Spyfall" may refer to:

 Spyfall (card game), a card game published by Hobby World
 "Spyfall" (Doctor Who), a two-part episode of the twelfth series of Doctor Who

See also 
 Skyfall (disambiguation)